The William Brooks Farm, also known as the Washington Stanley Farm, is a farmsite located at 3521 Big Beaver Road in Troy, Michigan.  It was designated a Michigan State Historic Site in 1971 and listed on the National Register of Historic Places in 1972.

History
Washington Stanley was born in Shaftsbury, Vermont in 1807. There he married a young wife, Lydia, and in 1826 moved with his wife and widowed mother to this site. He built a log cabin and began farming. Washington and Lydia Stanley had six children over the next 15 years, and when Lydia died, Stanley remarried Catherine Elisha Barringer in Macomb, Michigan, on 16 Feb 1842. In 1852, Stanley built the two-story fieldstone house that sits on the site.  Stanley died in 1873 and the farm passed to his daughter Elizabeth and her husband Frank Ford.

The Fords continued to farm the property, and in 1911 their daughter, Alta Ford Peabody, sold the farm to William Brooks.  The Brooks family used it as a dairy until 1960, when they sold most of the property to developers.  The Brooks family continued to live in the house until the mid-1970s, when they sold it to the Kresge Foundation.  The Foundation continues to use the property as their headquarters, and has connected the original farmhouse and barn with a modern addition in 2006.

Description
The William Brooks Farm consists of a farmhouse and various outbuildings, including a machine shop with a smokehouse, hog barns, dairy barns, a milk house, a silo, and a corn crib.  The farmhouse is a well-preserved two-story fieldstone Greek Revival structure built on a rectangular plan with side gables.  The windows are six-over-six anes with shutters. The front facade has a single-story, columned porch with Gothic detail, and the date of construction (1852) is carved into a stone block above the east-side window.  A covered porch is built on the rear.

References

Further reading

Houses on the National Register of Historic Places in Michigan
Houses completed in 1852
Buildings and structures in Troy, Michigan
Michigan State Historic Sites
Houses in Oakland County, Michigan
National Register of Historic Places in Oakland County, Michigan
1826 establishments in Michigan Territory